The New Zealand General Service Medal 2002 (Timor-Leste) is a New Zealand campaign medal for service in Timor-Leste during and after the 2006 East Timorese crisis between 28 April 2006 and 31 December 2012.

Regulations
The New Zealand General Service Medal (Timor-Leste) was awarded for service within the political boundaries and airspace of Timor-Leste, as well as within a maritime area of  around Timor-Leste and Atauro Island. Service must have been for 30 days or 7 sorties during the period from 28 April 2006 to 31 December 2012.

Appearance 
The New Zealand General Service Medal (Timor-Leste) is circular in shape and is made of silver-plated metal. The obverse of the medal bears the Effigy of the reigning Sovereign. The reverse bears the inscription THE NEW ZEALAND GENERAL SERVICE MEDAL surrounded by a wreath of fern fronds, pohutukawa, and kowhai blossoms, surmounted by a Royal Crown.

References

New Zealand campaign medals
Orders, decorations, and medals related to service in East Timor